Pteronarcella regularis, the dwarf salmonfly, is a species of giant stonefly in the family Pteronarcyidae. It is found in North America.

References

Plecoptera
Articles created by Qbugbot
Insects described in 1874